This is a list of adverse effects of the antidepressant paroxetine, sorted by frequency of occurrence.

Very common
Very common (10-100% incidence) adverse effects include:
 Nausea
 Sexual dysfunction (including anorgasmia (difficulty achieving an orgasm), erectile dysfunction, genital anaesthesia, ejaculation disorder, loss of libido etc.). Paroxetine is associated with a higher rate of sexual dysfunction than other SSRIs.
 Impaired concentration
 Somnolence is more common with paroxetine than with other SSRIs.
 Insomnia
 Headache
 Dry mouth

Common
Common (1-10% incidence) adverse effects include:

 Changes in appetite
 Dyspepsia (indigestion)
 Tooth disorder
 Stomatitis
 Oropharyngeal disorder
 Flatulence
 Impaired urination
 Urinary frequency
 Agitation
 Abnormal dreams (including intense dreams or nightmares)
 Hypercholesterolaemia (elevated blood cholesterol)
 Dizziness
 Tremor
 Blurred vision
 Yawning
 Diarrhoea which is less common with paroxetine than with other SSRIs.
 Constipation (if chronic may lead to hemorrhoids)
 Vomiting
 Anxiety
 Nervousness
 Hypomania, may occur in as many as 8% of patients being treated with paroxetine. May be more common in those with bipolar disorder.
 Asthenia
 Weight gain or loss. Usually gain, paroxetine tends to produce more weight gain than other SSRIs.
 Confusion
 Emotional lability
 Myoclonus
 Myopathy
 Myalgia
 Myasthenia
 Drugged feeling
 Hyperthesia
 Respiratory disorder
 Pharyngitis
 Increased cough
 Rhinitis
 Taste perversion
 Abnormal vision
 Pruritus (itching)
 Sweat gland disorder
 Abdominal pain
 Fever
 Chest pain
 Trauma
 Back pain
 Malaise
 Pain
 Palpitations
 Vasodilatation
 Postural hypotension (a drop in blood pressure upon standing up)
 Hypertension (high blood pressure)
 Syncope (fainting)
 Tachycardia (high heart rate)

Uncommon
Uncommon (0.1-1% incidence) adverse effects include:

 Abnormal bleeding, predominantly of the skin and mucous membranes (mostly ecchymosis)
 Confusion
 Hallucinations
 Extrapyramidal disorders (which occurs more commonly in paroxetine-treating patients than patients treated with other SSRIs)
 Sinus tachycardia
 Transient changes in blood pressure
 Urinary retention
 Urinary incontinence
 Allergic reaction
 Chills
 Face oedema
 Infection
 Bradycardia
 Conduction abnormalities
 Abnormal ECG
 Hypotension
 Ventricular extrasystoles
 Acne
 Alopecia (hair loss)
 Dry skin
 Eczema
 Furunculosis
 Herpes simplex
 Urticaria
 Bruxism
 Buccal cavity disorders
 Dysphagia
 Eructation
 Gastroenteritis
 Gastrointestinal flu
 Glossitis
 Increased salivation
 Abnormal liver function tests
 Mouth ulceration
 Rectal haemorrhage
 Miscarriage
 Amenorrhoea (lack of menstrual cycles)
 Breast pain
 Cystitis
 Dysmenorrhoea
 Dysuria
 Menorrhagia
 Nocturia
 Polyuria
 Urinary tract infection
 Urinary urgency
 Vaginitis
 Anaemia
 Leucopenia
 Lymphadenopathy
 Purpura
 White blood cell abnormality
 Oedema
 Hyperglycaemia (high blood sugar)
 Peripheral oedema
 Thirst
 Arthralgia
 Arthritis
 Traumatic fracture
 Abnormal thinking
 Akinesia
 Alcohol use disorder
 Amnesia (memory loss)
 Ataxia
 Convulsion
 Lack of emotion
 Paranoid reaction
 Asthma
 Bronchitis
 Dyspnoea (air hunger)
 Epistaxis
 Hyperventilation
 Pneumonia
 Respiratory flu
 Sinusitis
 Abnormality of accommodation
 Conjunctivitis
 Ear pain
 Eye pain 
 Mydriasis
 Otitis media
 Tinnitus
 Keratoconjunctivitis

Rare
Rare (0.01-0.1% incidence) adverse effects include:

 Mania, may be more common in those that either have or have a family history of bipolar disorder.
 Depersonalisation
 Panic disorder
 Akathisia
 Restless legs syndrome
 Elevated liver enzymes
 Hyperprolactinaemia (elevated serum prolactin)
 Galactorrhoea (lactation that is not associated with pregnancy or breastfeeding)
 Abnormal laboratory value
 Abscess
 Adrenergic syndrome
 Cellulitis
 Chills and fever
 Cyst
 Hernia
 Intentional overdose
 Neck rigidity
 Pelvic pain
 Peritonitis
 Substernal chest pain
 Ulcer
 Angina pectoris
 Arrhythmia
 Atrial arrhythmia
 Atrial fibrillation
 Bundle branch block
 Cerebral ischaemia
 Cerebrovascular accident (stroke)
 Congestive heart failure
 Extrasystoles
 Low cardiac output
 Myocardial infarct (heart attack)
 Myocardial ischaemia
 Pallor
 Phlebitis
 Pulmonary embolus
 Supraventricular extrasystoles
 Thrombophlebitis
 Thrombosis
 Varicose vein
 Vascular headache
 Angioedema
 Contact dermatitis
 Erythema nodosum
 Herpes zoster
 Hirsutism
 Maculopapular rash
 Photosensitivity
 Skin discolouration
 Skin ulcer
 Diabetes mellitus
 Hyperthyroidism
 Hypothyroidism
 Thyroiditis
 Aphthous stomatitis
 Bloody diarrhoea
 Bulimia
 Colitis
 Duodenitis
 Oesophagitis
 Faecal impaction
 Faecal incontinence
 Gastritis
 Gingivitis
 Haematemesis (vomiting blood)
 Hepatitis
 Ileus
 Jaundice
 Melaena (black faeces as a result of bleeding in the stomach)
 Salivary gland enlargement
 Stomach ulcer
 Stomatitis
 Tongue oedema
 Tooth caries
 Tooth malformation
 Breast atrophy
 Female lactation
 Haematuria (blood in the urine)
 Kidney calculus (kidney stones)
 Abnormal kidney function
 Kidney pain
 Mastitis
 Nephritis
 Oliguria
 Urethritis
 Urine abnormality
 Vaginal candidiasis
 Eosinophilia
 Iron deficiency anaemia
 Leucocytosis
 Lymphoedema
 Lymphocytosis
 Microcytic anaemia
 Monocytosis
 Normocytic anaemia
 Increased alkaline phosphatase
 Bilirubinaemia
 Dehydration
 Gout
 Hyperphosphataemia (elevated levels of phosphate in the blood)
 Hypocalcaemia (low blood calcium)
 Hypoglycaemia (low blood sugar)
 Hypokalaemia (low blood potassium)
 Hyponatraemia (low blood sodium)
 Obesity
 Arthrosis
 Bursitis
 Cartilage disorder
 Myositis
 Osteoporosis (brittle bones)
 Tetany
 Abnormal electroencephalograph
 Abnormal gait
 Choreoathetosis
 Circumoral paraesthesia
 Delirium
 Delusions
 Diplopia
 Drug dependence
 Dysarthria
 Euphoria
 Fasciculations
 Grand mal convulsions
 Hyperalgesia
 Hysteria
 Increased libido
 Manic depressive reaction
 Meningitis
 Myelitis
 Neuralgia
 Neuropathy
 Nystagmus
 Psychosis
 Psychotic depression
 Increased reflexes
 Stupor
 Withdrawal syndrome
 Hiccup
 Lung fibrosis
 Increased sputum
 Voice alteration
 Emphysema 
 Pulmonary oedema
 Amblyopia
 Specified cataract
 Conjunctival oedema
 Corneal lesion
 Corneal ulcer
 Exophthalmos
 Eye haemorrhage
 Glaucoma
 Hyperacusis
 Otitis externa
 Photophobia
 Retinal haemorrhage (bleeding into the retina)
 Taste loss
 Anisocoria
 Deafness
 Activation syndrome

Very rare
Rare (<0.01% incidence) adverse effects include:
 Thrombocytopenia
 Syndrome of inappropriate secretion of antidiuretic hormone (SIADH)
 Serotonin syndrome (symptoms may include agitation, confusion, diaphoresis, hallucinations, hyperreflexia, myoclonus, shivering, tachycardia and tremor)
 Gastrointestinal bleeding
 Hepatic events (such as hepatitis, sometimes associated with jaundice and/or liver failure)
 Priapism
 Severe cutaneous adverse reactions (including erythema multiforme, Stevens–Johnson syndrome and toxic epidermal necrolysis)
 Photosensitivity reactions

References

Paroxetine